The 1992 MTV Video Music Awards aired live on September 9, 1992, honoring the best music videos from June 16, 1991, to June 15, 1992. The show was hosted by Dana Carvey at UCLA's Pauley Pavilion in Los Angeles.

The night's biggest winners were Van Halen and the Red Hot Chili Peppers, as each group earned three moonmen that night.  Particularly, Van Halen's video for "Right Now" took home the main award of the night, Video of the Year, and received seven nominations, making it the most nominated video of the night.  The Red Hot Chili Peppers, meanwhile, won the award for Viewer's Choice and received a total of nine nominations for two of their videos, becoming the most nominated act of the night. Six of the Peppers' nominations were for "Give It Away", and the remaining three went to "Under the Bridge".

The show was notable for a feud between Axl Rose and members of Nirvana as well as Courtney Love. It began backstage before the awards show, when Love jokingly offered to make Rose the godfather of Frances Bean Cobain. Rose threatened Cobain, telling him to quiet his wife, and barbs were exchanged between Love and Rose's then-girlfriend Stephanie Seymour. Bassists Krist Novoselic and Duff McKagan almost came to blows over the incident, just before Nirvana were to take the stage. The spat went public onstage immediately after Nirvana's performance of "Lithium", as drummer Dave Grohl taunted Rose. Cobain then raised the dispute in post-show interviews at the VMA.

Along with Nirvana and Guns N' Roses, the night's performers included the likes of Bryan Adams, Def Leppard, En Vogue, the Red Hot Chili Peppers, Pearl Jam, and Eric Clapton, among others. Also, there was a special performance by U2 via satellite, with host Dana Carvey playing the drums for them from the Pauley Pavilion.  English band The Cure was slated to perform, but had to cancel their appearance, citing illness and exhaustion.

Background
MTV announced on June 23 that the 1992 Video Music Awards would be held on September 9 at UCLA's Pauley Pavilion and hosted by Dana Carvey. MTV cited the abilities to expand the number of performances and the size of the audience as reasons for moving to the Pauley Pavilion. Nominees were announced at a press conference held on July 7. In an effort to raise the energy of the ceremony, MTV increased the number of tickets available to the general public from 1,000 to 6,000. MTV also claimed that the ceremony was the first Video Music Awards to be completely live with no pre-recorded music. The ceremony broadcast was preceded by the 1992 MTV Video Music Awards Opening Act hosted by Kurt Loder, Tabitha Soren, John Norris, and Cindy Crawford.

Performances

Presenters

Pre-show
 Cindy Crawford – introduced the winners of the professional categories
 John Norris – presented Best Dance Video

Main show
 Eddie Murphy – presented Best Male Video
 Dana Carvey (as Johnny Carson) and Phil Hartman (as Ed McMahon) – appeared in Viewer's Choice Award vignettes
 John Corbett and Shannen Doherty – presented Best Direction in a Video
 David Spade, Andrew Dice Clay, Doug Bradley (as "Pinhead") and Ringo Starr – appeared in a series of vignettes at the 'talent check-in' table
 Ice-T and Metallica (Lars Ulrich and Kirk Hammett) – presented Best Rap Video
 Denis Leary – appeared in pre-recorded segments about what was 'coming up' on the show
 Halle Berry and Jean-Claude Van Damme – presented Best Video from a Film
 Marky Mark and Vanessa Williams – presented Breakthrough Video
 Roger Taylor and Brian May – presented the Video Vanguard Award
 Luke Perry and Howard Stern (as "Fartman") – presented Best Metal/Hard Rock Video
 VJs Angela Chow (Asia), Richard Wilkins (Australia), Cuca Lazarotto (Brasil), Ray Cokes (Europe) and Daisy Fuentes (Internacional) – announced their respective region's Viewer's Choice winner
 Denis Leary and Cindy Crawford – presented Viewer's Choice
 Kris Kross and Magic Johnson – presented Best Female Video
 Dana Carvey – presented Best Alternative Video
 Boyz II Men and Wilson Phillips – presented Best New Artist in a Video
 Peter Gabriel and Annie Lennox – presented Best Group Video
 Mick Jagger – presented Video of the Year

Winners and nominations
Winners, except for the Viewer's Choice awards, were selected by a panel of approximately 700 members of the music industry.

Winners are in bold text.

References

External links
 Official MTV site

1992
MTV Video Music Awards
MTV Video Music Awards
1992 in Los Angeles